Descamps v. United States, 570 U.S. 254 (2013), was a case in which the United States Supreme Court clarified standards for evaluating potential prior offenses under the Armed Career Criminal Act (ACCA). In an 8–1 decision written by Justice Elena Kagan, the Supreme Court held that judges may only look at the statutory elements of a crime, rather than the facts associated with that particular crime, "when the crime of which the defendant was convicted has a single, indivisible set of elements." In his review of the case for SCOTUSblog, Daniel Richman opined that following the Court's decision, "[w]hether or not a prior conviction is going to 'count' will have to be determined as mechanically as possible."

See also
Taylor v. United States
List of United States Supreme Court cases, volume 570
2012 term United States Supreme Court opinions of Elena Kagan

References

External links
 

United States Supreme Court cases of the Roberts Court
2013 in United States case law
United States Supreme Court cases
United States criminal case law
Armed Career Criminal Act case law